Delias itamputi is a butterfly in the family Pieridae. It was described by Carl Ribbe in 1900. It is endemic to Papua New Guinea.

References

External links
Delias at Markku Savela's Lepidoptera and Some Other Life Forms

itamputi
Butterflies described in 1900